Psathyrella canadensis is a species of agaric fungus in the family Psathyrellaceae. Described as new to science by American mycologist Alexander H. Smith in 1972, it is found in Canada and the United States, where it grows as a saprobe on rotting wood.

See also
List of Psathyrella species

References

External links

Fungi described in 1972
Fungi of Canada
Fungi of the United States
Psathyrellaceae
Fungi without expected TNC conservation status